On September 22, 1993, an Amtrak train derailed on the CSX Transportation Big Bayou Canot Bridge near Mobile, Alabama, United States. It was caused by displacement of a span and deformation of the rails when a tow of heavy barges collided with the rail bridge eight minutes earlier.  Forty-seven people were killed and 103 more were injured. To date, it is both the deadliest train wreck in Amtrak's history and the worst rail disaster in the United States since the 1958 Newark Bay rail accident in which 48 people died.

Events
Immediately prior to the accident, a barge being pushed by the towboat Mauvilla (owned and operated by Warrior and Gulf Navigation of Chickasaw, Alabama) had made a wrong turn on the Mobile River and entered the Big Bayou Canot, an un-navigable channel of water crossed by a CSX Transportation rail bridge.

The towboat's pilot, Willie Odom, was not properly trained on how to read his radar and so, due to very poor visibility in heavy fog and his lack of experience, did not realize he was off course. The boat also lacked a compass and a chart of the waters. Odom believed that he was still on the Mobile River and had identified the bridge in the radar as another tug boat. After the investigation, he was not found to be criminally liable for the accident.

The bridge was struck by the Mauvilla at about 2:45 a.m. The span had been designed to rotate so it could be converted to a swing bridge by adding suitable equipment. No such conversion had ever been performed but the span had not been adequately secured against unintended movement. The collision forced the unsecured end of the bridge span approximately  out of alignment and severely kinked the track.

The first of its three locomotives slammed into the displaced span, causing that part of the bridge to collapse into the water beneath. The lead locomotive embedded itself nose-first into the canal bank and the other two locomotives, together with the baggage car, sleeping car and two of the six passenger cars, plunged into the water. The locomotives' fuel tanks, each of which held several thousand gallons of diesel fuel, ruptured upon impact, resulting in a massive fuel spill and a fire. Forty-seven people, 42 of whom were passengers, were killed  many by drowning, others by fire/smoke inhalation. Another 103 were injured. The towboat's four crew members were not injured. Odom helped save seventeen people after the crash using the same towboat that had been pushing the barge that hit the bridge.

Despite the displacement of the bridge, the continuously welded rails did not break. As a result, the track circuit controlling the bridge approach block signals remained closed (intact) and the nearest signal continued to display a clear (green) aspect. Had one of the rails been severed by the bridge's displacement, the track circuit would have opened, causing the approach signal to display a stop (red) aspect and the preceding signal an yellow (approach) approach indication. This might have given the Amtrak engineer sufficient time to stop his train or at least reduce its speed in an effort to minimize the accident's severity.

Fatal delay
An episode of the National Geographic Channel documentary series Seconds From Disaster examined the accident. In addition to corroborating findings of the official accident report, the program revealed that the train had been delayed in New Orleans by repairs to an air conditioner unit and a toilet. This had put it a half-hour behind schedule. If not for this delay, the Sunset Limited would have passed over the Big Bayou Canot bridge twenty minutes before the bridge was hit by the barge.

Aftermath
As a result of its investigation of this accident, the National Transportation Safety Board (NTSB) made a comprehensive series of recommendations, on September 19, 1994, to the U.S. Department of Transportation, the U.S. Army Corps of Engineers, the U.S. Coast Guard, the Federal Emergency Management Agency, Amtrak, the American Waterways Operators, Inc., the Warrior & Gulf Navigation Company, the Association of American Railroads, and the American Short Line Railroad Association. Following a recommendation to maintain a record of onboard passenger numbers, Amtrak now records passenger lists electronically.

Notable passengers
 Eleven-year-old wheelchair user Andrea Chancey, the "miracle child" with cerebral palsy whose parents both died in the crash.
 Ken Ivory and Michael Dopheide, honored by the Coast Guard for saving lives after the crash.
 Christian theologian R. C. Sproul, who discussed his experience of the crash on occasion.

See also 
 List of bridge failures

References

External links 
 Holloway, David Mobile Press-Register 200th Anniversary: Sunset Limited train wreck memories not diminished by passing years at al.com, 1 July 2013. Retrieved 3 June 2014
 Sproul, R. C. Train Wreck Eyewitness account of aftermath, at Ligonier Ministries blog. Retrieved 3 June 2014
 Summary and photos at Trainweb.org. Retrieved 3 June 2014
 Graphical re-enactment of accident cause at TMBA Inc Animation Studio, New York. Retrieved 3 June 2014
 U.S. Coast Guard: 

Explosions in 1993
September 1993 events in the United States
Derailments in the United States
Accidents and incidents involving Amtrak
Accidents and incidents involving CSX Transportation
Barges
Railway accidents in 1993
Explosions in the United States
Railway accidents involving fog
Maritime accidents involving fog
Maritime incidents in 1993
Maritime incidents in the United States
Transportation disasters in Alabama
Bridge disasters in the United States
Bridge disasters caused by collision
Events in Mobile, Alabama
Rail transportation in Alabama
Big Bayou